Gustav Wahlund (February 2, 1856 – November 9, 1934) was an American Lutheran clergyman and politician.

Wahlund was born in Dalsland, Sweden and emigrated to the United States and then settled in Minnesota, in 1882. He graduated from Augustana College and Theological Seminary (now Augustana College in 1884. Wahlund lived in Spring Lake, Isanti County, Minnesota with his wife and family. They then moved to Wyoming, Minnesota and Wahlund served as a Lutheran minister. Wahlund served in the Minnesota House of Representatives from 1891 to 1894 and in the Minnesota Senate from 1923 to 1926. He was a Republican.

References

1856 births
1934 deaths
Swedish emigrants to the United States
People from Chisago County, Minnesota
People from Isanti County, Minnesota
Augustana College (Illinois) alumni
19th-century American Lutheran clergy
20th-century American Lutheran clergy
Republican Party members of the Minnesota House of Representatives
Republican Party Minnesota state senators